Mark Noble (1754–1827) was an English clergyman, biographer and antiquary.

Life
He was born in Digbeth, Birmingham, the third surviving son of William Heatley Noble, a merchant there. His father sold, among many other commodities, beads, knives, toys, and other trifles which he distributed wholesale among slave traders, and he had also a large mill for rolling silver and for plating purposes. Mark was educated at schools at Yardley, Worcestershire, and Ashbourne, Derbyshire. On the death of his father he inherited a modest fortune, and was articled to Mr. Barber, a solicitor of Birmingham. On the expiration of his indentures he went into business on his own account; but turned to literature and history.

In 1781 he was ordained to the curacies of Baddesley Clinton and Packwood, Warwickshire. On the sudden death of the incumbent, Noble was himself presented to the two livings ('starvations,' he called them). Noble, now a married man, took a house at Knowle, Warwickshire, conveniently situated for both his parishes. Here he divided his interests among his congregation, his books, and a farm.

The Earl of Sandwich supported his writings, and Noble was a frequent guest at Hinchingbrooke House, and a regular correspondent of Lord Sandwich. Lord Leicester also became a patron, and appointed Noble his chaplain. On the recommendation of Sandwich and Leicester Lord Chancellor Thurlow presented Noble to the rectory of Barming, Kent in 1786, where he lived for 42 years.

He was elected Fellow of the Society of Antiquaries of London on 1 March 1781; and was also F.S.A. of Edinburgh.  In 1816, he was elected a member of the American Antiquarian Society. He died at Barming on 26 May 1827, and was buried in the church, where a monument was erected to his memory.

Works
In 1784 Noble produced a compilation Memoirs of the Protectoral House of Cromwell, 2 vols. London, 1784 (2nd edit., "with improvements", 1787); it contains many errors. Both editions were severely handled by Richard Gough in the preface to his "Short Genealogical View of the Family of Oliver Cromwell" (printed as a portion of the Bibliotheca Topographica Britannica in 1785), and in the Gentleman's Magazine for June 1787 (p. 516), and by William Richards of Lynn in A Review, &c., 1787. A copy containing unpublished corrections belongs to his descendants. While excoriating Noble's "extreme imbecility," Thomas Carlyle made use of the book in his Oliver Cromwell's Letters and Speeches. Out of his materials Noble made two volumes, The Lives of the English Regicides, Birmingham, 1798. From the materials left by Granger and his own collections Noble compiled a Continuation (3 vols. London, 1806) of James Granger's Biographical History of England.

His other works are:
Two Dissertations on the Mint and Coins of the Episcopal Palatines of Durham, Birmingham, 1780
A Genealogical History of the present Royal Families of Europe, the Stadtholders of the United States, and the Succession of Popes from the Fifteenth Century to the present time, London, 1781
An Historical Genealogy of the Royal House of Stuarts from Robert II to James VI, London, 1795
Memoirs of the illustrious House of Medici, London, 1797
A History of the College of Arms, London, 1804 (some copies are dated 1805)

He contributed five papers to Archaeologia. His library, which was sold in December 1827, included a large number of manuscript works by him.

A youthful portrait of Noble, engraved by Robert Hancock, was prefixed to the first edition of his Memoirs of Cromwell. An oval portrait, engraved by John Keyse Sherwin, was prefixed to the second edition.

Notes
End notes

Citations

References
Attribution

External links
 

1754 births
1827 deaths
18th-century English Anglican priests
19th-century English Anglican priests
English biographers
English antiquarians
Fellows of the Society of Antiquaries of London
Members of the American Antiquarian Society
People from Barming
People from Birmingham, West Midlands